Super trawlers in Australia may refer to: -

 Seafish Tasmania

or individual ships: -

 Naeraberg, named FV Geelong Star while in Australia
 FV_Margiris, named Abel Tasman while in Australia